Lincoln Theatre is a historic theatre building located at Marion, Smyth County, Virginia. It was opened in 1929, and is a three-story theater located behind the Royal Oak Apartment House. Access to the theatre is through a broad arcade on the ground floor of the apartment house. The interior of the theatre is designed to suggest an ancient Mayan temple.  It also features six large paintings, depicting scenes from American and local history.  The theatre closed in 1977.  It later reopened in 2004 as a community performing arts center.

It was listed on the National Register of Historic Places in 1992. It is located in the Marion Historic District.

References

External links
Lincoln Theatre website

Performing arts centers in Virginia
Theatres on the National Register of Historic Places in Virginia
Theatres completed in 1929
Buildings and structures in Smyth County, Virginia
National Register of Historic Places in Smyth County, Virginia
Individually listed contributing properties to historic districts on the National Register in Virginia